Inovicellina is a suborder under order Cheilostomatida. It includes two genera, Aetea and Callaetea. The colony structure consists of tubular encrusting zooids, with an erect column at one end opening in the orifice.

References

Protostome suborders
Monotypic protostome taxa
Cheilostomatida